Osvaldas Jablonskis  (born 1944) is a Lithuanian painter.

See also
List of Lithuanian painters

References

This article was initially translated from the Lithuanian Wikipedia.

Lithuanian painters
1944 births
Living people
Date of birth missing (living people)